Geneseo Middle/High School is a public high school located in Geneseo, Livingston County, New York, United States. It is the only high school operated by the Geneseo Central School District.

References

Schools in Livingston County, New York
Public high schools in New York (state)